The 1978 Minnesota House of Representatives election was held in the U.S. state of Minnesota on November 7, 1978, to elect members to the House of Representatives of the 71st Minnesota Legislature. A primary election was held on September 12, 1978.

The Minnesota Democratic–Farmer–Labor Party (DFL) and Independent-Republicans of Minnesota won an equal number of seats. The new Legislature convened on January 3, 1979.

Results

Aftermath
As a result of the House being equally divided, under an agreement reached between the two parties, the Independent-Republicans would be given the speakership, the chairs of the divisions of the appropriations and tax committees, and a one-vote majority on the divisions of the tax committee. The DFL would be given the chairs and a one-vote majority on the rules and tax committees as well as the chair of the appropriations committee. The chairs and membership of the remaining committees would be equally divided.

See also
 Minnesota Senate election, 1976
 Minnesota gubernatorial election, 1978

References

Bibliography
 

1978 Minnesota elections
Minnesota House of Representatives elections
Minnesota